Sporthalle was an indoor arena located in Böblingen, Germany. It opened in 1966 and was torn down in 2008. Sporthalle had a capacity to hold 6,500 people.

The venue played host to six team handball competitions for the 1972 Summer Olympics in neighboring Munich.

Further, it served as one of two playgrounds for the FIBA EuroBasket 1971.

It hosted indoor sporting events, trade shows, TV shows, music concerts and other events.

References
1972 Summer Olympics official report. Volume 1. Part 1. p. 121.
1972 Summer Olympics official report. Volume 3. p. 375.
Micronuts.net photos of a 2006 concert.  - accessed 28 August 2010.
Official website 
Setlist.fm profile of music concerts that took place. - accessed 28 August 2010.

Venues of the 1972 Summer Olympics
Defunct sports venues in Germany
Olympic handball venues
Defunct indoor arenas
Sports venues in Baden-Württemberg
Buildings and structures in Böblingen
Sports venues demolished in 2008